Kanada (written: 金田) is a Japanese surname. Notable people with the surname include:

Craig Kanada (born 1968), American golfer
, Japanese mathematician
, Japanese sprint canoeist
, Japanese animator

Japanese-language surnames